Orlando generoso is an opera of Agostino Steffani composed to a libretto by Ortensio Mauro after Ariosto's Orlando furioso. The opera was written in 1691, Steffani's fourth for the Duchy of Hanover. The opera was presented again in Hanover in 1692, and in 1695 it was performed at the Oper am Gänsemarkt in Hamburg.


See also
 
 List of compositions by Agostino Steffani

Recording
Kai Wessel (Orlando), Roberta Invernizzi (Angelica), Susanne Rydén (Bradamante), Franz Vitzthum (Ruggiero), Jörg Waschinski (Medoro), Daniel Lager (Galafro), Wolf Matthias Friedrich (Atlante). Musica Alta Ripa dir. Bernward Lohr 3CD MDG

References

Further reading

 
 
 

1691 operas
Operas by Agostino Steffani
Operas based on works by Ludovico Ariosto
Operas